Oscar Hollow is a stream in Wayne County in the U.S. state of Missouri. It is a tributary to Kentucky Slough.

Oscar Hollow has the name of Oscar Lurker, a pioneer citizen.

See also
List of rivers of Missouri

References

Rivers of Wayne County, Missouri
Rivers of Missouri